Probable G-protein coupled receptor 133 is a protein that in humans is encoded by the GPR133 gene.

This gene encodes a member of the adhesion-GPCR family of receptors. Family members are characterized by an extended extracellular region with a variable number of protein domains coupled to a TM7 domain via a domain known as the GPCR-Autoproteolysis INducing (GAIN) domain.

References

Further reading

G protein-coupled receptors